Fruity Pie (lit. "Fruit Ice Cream") is a children's educational television show produced by the Taiwan Public Television Service.

Setting and premise 
Fruity Pie takes place in a store run by "Granny Fruity Pie." Her friends Chi Chi, Lin Lin, Sarah, and Walu are talking banana children portrayed by puppets who live with her. It also features a mermaid named Mei Ling who comes out singing from her shell leading to a song from the show. The show features stories and songs that sometimes teach like counting.

Broadcast 
In the United States, Fruity Pie airs weekdays at 8:30am on KTSF 26/San Francisco.

References

External links 
 Official site

Taiwanese television shows
Taiwanese children's television series
Taiwanese television shows featuring puppetry